Greek National Road 15 (abbreviated as EO15) is a single carriageway road in northern Greece. It connects Agios Germanos, near the border with North Macedonia, with the Greek National Road 6 near Kalampaka. It passes through Kastoria, Siatista and Grevena.

15
Roads in Western Macedonia
Roads in Thessaly